Karen Dolan is an American politician serving as a member of the Vermont House of Representatives for the Chittenden-8-2 district. Elected in November 2020, she assumed office on January 6, 2021.

Early life and education 
A native of Vermont, Dolan was raised in the Northeast Kingdom region. She earned a bachelor's degree from the University of Vermont.

Career 
Prior to entering politics, Dolan worked as a restorative justice specialist for the Essex Community Justice Center. She was elected to the Vermont House of Representatives in November 2020 and assumed office on January 6, 2021.

References 

Living people
Democratic Party members of the Vermont House of Representatives
People from Essex, Vermont
Women state legislators in Vermont
Year of birth missing (living people)